Qinarjeh (also Romanized as Qīnarjeh; also known as Qīnarcheh and Qīzjeh) is a village in Mojezat Rural District, in the Central District of Zanjan County, Zanjan Province, Iran. At the 2006 census, its population was 439, in 100 families.

References 

Populated places in Zanjan County